The Ministry of Digital Transformation is a government ministry in Ukraine that was established on 29 August 2019 when Mykhailo Fedorov was appointed as Minister of Digital Transformation in the Honcharuk Government.

The ministry's most important project is the so-called "state in a smartphone" project that was aiming that by 2024 100% of all government services should be available online with 20% of services provided automatically, without the intervention of an official, and 1 online fill-in form to receive a package of services "in any life situation". On 5 November 2019 Fedorov wrote on Facebook that the "state in a smartphone" project would not be founded by the state budget in 2020 (but he hoped it would be in 2021) but that it would rely "on an effective team and international technical assistance, public-private partnerships, volunteering." The following day Prime Minister Oleksiy Honcharuk stressed that each government ministry had planned expenditures for digitization and that the Ministry of Digital Transformation did have a separate budget and that thus the state budget was sufficient to launch the "state in a smartphone" project in 2020.

List of ministers

Activities of the ministry 
The Ministry of Digital Transformation is working to create a "state in a smartphone" that combines a mobile application and a public services portal. One of the important tasks of the Ministry is the development of digital literacy of citizens, which is why on January 21, 2020, the Ministry of Digital Transformation will launch courses on digital education.

The goals of the ministry by 2024:

 transfer 100% of all public services for citizens and businesses online; 
 provide 95% of transport infrastructure, settlements and their social facilities with access to high-speed Internet; 
 to teach 6 million Ukrainians digital skills; 
 increase the share of IT in the country's GDP to 10%.

Electronic services 
The Ministry of Digital Transformation of Ukraine, together with other public authorities and international partners, promotes the introduction of electronic services in many areas of the economy - construction, land services, ecology, business registration, subsidies, state aid and more. Now on the Government portal kmu.gov.ua in the section "Services" you can use more than 100 electronic services.

On February 6, 2020, the mobile app and web portal Diia ("Action") were officially launched, which should become a universal access point for citizens and businesses to all electronic government services according to common standards.

Open data 
The Ministry of Digital Transformation of Ukraine is the state body responsible for implementing this policy of the Government on the disclosure of the most important data for society. In October 2016, Ukraine formally acceded to the International Open Data Charter, committing itself to the international community to implement a national open data policy in accordance with the principles of the Charter.

Open data have a strong anti-corruption effect, promote government transparency, and have a positive impact on economic development. In 2017, open data brought more than $700 million, or 0.67% of GDP, to Ukraine's economy. And while maintaining the current rate, according to forecasts, by 2025 this figure will double - to more than $1.4 billion, or 0.92% of GDP. With the support of the Ministry, a report on the impact of open data of the State Architectural and Construction Inspectorate of Ukraine was published.

Response to 2022 invasion

Within three days of the invasion, the ministry organised a campaign to pressurise techology companies to boycott Russia. They have also secured access to Starlink and recruited the IT Army of Ukraine. Together with Kuna.io cryptocurrency exchange from Ukraine and itc CEO Michael Chobanian the Ministry initiated the creation of the largest fundraising cryptofund in the world called Crypto Fund for Ukraine aimed to help the Armed Forces of Ukraine combat Russian invasion.

In May 2022, Diia App organized the voting on the whether Ukrainians should own weapons, which was initiated by the Minister of Internal Affairs of Ukraine, Denys Monastyrskyi. Almost 59% of respondents voted to allow weapons for personal protection.

See also
 Honcharuk Government
 Shmygal Government
 Delta (situational awareness system)

Notes

References

External links
 Official website 
 

Digital Transformation
Digital Transformation
Ukraine, Digital Transformation
Ukraine
2019 establishments in Ukraine
Information technology in Ukraine
E-government in Ukraine